Kaberamaido is a district in Eastern Uganda. Like most other Ugandan districts, it is named after its 'chief town', Kaberamaido, where the district headquarters are located.

Location
Kaberamaido District lies approximately between Latitudes:1.5500 to 2.3834 and Longitudes:30.0167 to 34.3000. The average coordinates of the district are:01 47N, 33 09E. The district is bordered by Alebtong District to the north, Amuria District to the northeast, Soroti District to the east, Serere District to the southeast, Buyende District to the south, Amolatar District to the southwest and Dokolo District to the northwest.

Physical measurements
The following are the district measurements:
 Total Area : 
 Total Land Area :  (75.7%)
 Forest Area :  (1.3%)
 Open Water Area :  (16.4%)
 Area Under Wetlands :  (8.7%)

Population
In 1991, the national population census estimated the population of the district at about 81,500. The district had a population of approximately 131,700 in 2002, according to the national census that year, with an annual population growth rate of 4.3%. In 2012, it was estimated that the population of Kaberamaido District was approximately 199,200. The table below, illustrates how the district has grown between 2002 and 2012. All numbers are estimates.

Ethnicities
Kaberamaido District is the main area of the Kumam people. In 2008, the Kumam were in the majority, totaling 99,738 (74.7%) of the population. The Iteso were the next most populous group in the district, totaling 27,317 people (20.5%). These two ethnicities respectively, speak Kumam and Ateso languages and are of the Nilotic family. The Langi at 4,617 people (3.5%) are the next most populous group. The other tribal groups found in the district constitute less than 1% of the district population in individual tribal terms. These include, the Acholi, Bagwere, Bakenyi, Baruli, Mening, Basoga, Baganda and Alur.

See also

References

External links
 Kaberamaido District Homepage

 
Teso sub-region
Districts of Uganda
Eastern Region, Uganda